Thomas Olof "Tolle" Lagerlöf (born 15 November 1971) is a Swedish football coach. A former player for Stockholm rivals AIK, he is the coach of the Allsvenskan team Djurgårdens IF.

Honours

Player 
AIK

 Swedish Champion: 1992, 1998

Manager 
Djurgårdens IF

 Allsvenskan: 2019

References

1971 births
Living people
Footballers from Stockholm
Swedish footballers
Association football midfielders
AIK Fotboll players
IF Brommapojkarna players
Lyn Fotball players
Allsvenskan players
Superettan players
Eliteserien players
Swedish expatriate footballers
Expatriate footballers in Norway
Swedish football managers
IK Sirius Fotboll managers